HMS Alban was the American letter of marque William Bayard, launched in New York in 1812, that the British Royal Navy captured in 1813 and took into service. She had an unexceptional career and was broken up in 1822.

American schooner
Captain Allyn Mather acquired a letter of marque on 30 January 1813. The British warships  and  captured William Bayard on 13 March 1813.

Royal Navy
The Royal Navy commissioned William Bayard as HMS Alban in October 1813 under Lieutenant Mayson Wright. Wright was promoted to Commander on 7 October, and Alban was re-rated as a sloop to be commensurate with Wright's promotion.

On 2 September 1814 Alban recaptured the brig Favorite, of 158 tons (bm). Favorite had been sailing from Calcutta to Port Jackson when the American privateer  had captured Favorite on 27 April 1814 in the eastern Indian Ocean. Her master's name was given as W.Mayton, and her cargo consisted of tea, sugar, rice, and piece goods. (By another report, Hyder Ali had captured Favorite on 9 May.

On 10 September Alban captured Betsey. Betey, Hiram Geyar, master, had been sailing from Boston to Machias with a cargo of flour and provisions.

In January 1815 Commander David Boyd replaced Mayson. Commander Hugh Payson replaced Boyd in 1816. Alban was paid off in October 1818. In November Lieutenant Robert Gibson took command and remained in command until 1820.

Fate
Alban was broken on 18 February 1822.

Citations

References
 
 
 
 
 

1812 ships
Ships built in the United States
Captured ships
Schooners of the Royal Navy